Det Nye was a Norwegian language women's magazine based in Oslo, Norway. It was one of the oldest magazines published in the country. In November 2019 it went on online.

History and profile
Det Nye was first published in 1957. The target group of the magazine is women aged 18–25 years. The magazine was published on a monthly basis until 1989 when its frequency was shifted to 15-17 times a year. It is owned and published by Egmont Group. Its headquarters was in Oslo.

The target audience of  Det Nye is young women aged 18–35 years. The magazine contains feature articles as well as material on careers, fashion, sex and relationships. The magazine also covers articles concerning the liberation of women. From September 2006 the chief editor was Elizabeth Skårberg. In 2008 Hanne Aardal was made the magazine's editor in chief. On 1 March 2011 Mari Midtstigen was appointed editor.

In November 2019 it was decided that the paper edition of Det Nye would be closed down.

Circulation
Det Nye had a circulation of 110,400 copies in 1981 and 113,600 copies in 1982. In 1999 it was one of the best-selling two women's magazines in Norway with a circulation of 70,000 copies.

See also
 List of Norwegian magazines

References

External links
 Official website

1957 establishments in Norway
2019 disestablishments in Norway
Defunct magazines published in Norway
Magazines established in 1957
Magazines disestablished in 2019
Magazines published in Oslo
Norwegian-language magazines
Monthly magazines published in Norway
Women's magazines published in Norway
Online magazines with defunct print editions